The 1991 Bauchi State gubernatorial election occurred on December 14, 1991. NRC candidate Dahiru Mohammed won the election.

Conduct
The gubernatorial election was conducted using an open ballot system. Primaries for the two parties to select their flag bearers were conducted on October 19, 1991.

The election occurred on December 14, 1991. NRC candidate Dahiru Mohammed won the election.

References 

Bauchi State gubernatorial elections
Bauchi State gubernatorial election
Bauchi State gubernatorial election